Michael Herbert Schur (born October 29, 1975) is an American television producer, writer, director and actor. He was a producer and writer for the comedy series The Office, and co-created Parks and Recreation with Office producer Greg Daniels. He created The Good Place, co-created the comedy series Brooklyn Nine-Nine and was a producer on the series Master of None. He also played Mose Schrute in The Office. In 2021, he was one of three co-creators for the Peacock comedy series Rutherford Falls.

Schur's comedies typically include large, diverse casts; break-out stars have emerged from his shows. He features optimistic characters who often find strong friendships and lasting love, through plots that showcase "good-hearted humanistic warmth." As of September 2021, Schur has been nominated for 19 Primetime Emmy Awards, winning two for his work on Saturday Night Live (1997–2004) and The Office.

Early life
Schur was born in 1975, at the University of Michigan Hospital in Ann Arbor, Michigan, to a Jewish family. His parents are Warren M. Schur and Anne Herbert. The family moved and he was raised in West Hartford, Connecticut. 

He first became interested in comedy when he was 11 years old, when he read Without Feathers, a 1975 collection of humorous essays by Woody Allen. Schur said he found the book on his father's bookshelf and stayed up reading it until 4 a.m.

Schur attended William H. Hall High School in West Hartford. Schur graduated Phi Beta Kappa with a B.A. major in English from Harvard University in 1997, where he was a president of the Harvard Lampoon.

Career
Starting in 1998, Schur was a writer on NBC's Saturday Night Live. Schur became the producer of Weekend Update in 2001; his first show in the new role was Saturday Night Lives first episode after the September 11 attacks. 

In 2002, he won his first Primetime Emmy Award as part of SNLs writing team. Schur left Saturday Night Live in 2004.

Soon afterward, he became producer and writer for The Office on NBC, for which he wrote ten episodes and won the 2006 Emmy Award for Outstanding Comedy Series. Schur appeared on The Office as Dwight's cousin Mose in several episodes, including "Initiation", in which Dwight takes Ryan to his beet farm, "Money", in which Jim and Pam spend a night at the farm, "The Deposition", "Koi Pond", "Counseling" and "Finale". He also co-wrote The Office: The Accountants webisodes with Paul Lieberstein.

In 2005, Schur served as a co-producer of HBO's The Comeback and wrote two of its 13 episodes.

Schur also wrote for Fire Joe Morgan, a sports journalism blog, under the pseudonym "Ken Tremendous". Schur resurrected the pen name on March 31, 2011, when he began writing for SB Nation's Baseball Nation site. @KenTremendous is also Schur's Twitter handle.

In April 2008, Schur and Greg Daniels started working on a pilot for Parks and Recreation as a proposed spin-off of The Office. Over time, Schur realized Parks and Recreation would work better if they made it separate from The Office. While Parks and Recreation received negative reviews in its first season, it received critical acclaim in the second, much like The Office.

Schur collaborated with The Decemberists on their music video for "Calamity Song" from the album The King Is Dead. This video is based upon Eschaton, a mock-nuclear war game played on tennis courts that David Foster Wallace created in his 1996 novel Infinite Jest. Schur wrote his undergraduate senior thesis on the novel, and once held the film rights to it.

With Daniel J. Goor, Schur created the cop comedy Brooklyn Nine-Nine, which premiered in fall 2013 on Fox. The show was moved to NBC in its sixth season. The show boasts six awards.

In 2013, Joe Posnanski and Schur created The PosCast which is now hosted by Meadowlark Media. The podcast primarily discusses baseball but meanders into other sports, subjects, drafts of random items, and prides itself in being meaningless. The podcast has featured notable guests and co-hosts such as Linda Holmes, Ken Rosenthal, Nick Offerman, Ellen Adair, Stefan Fatsis, Brandon McCarthy, Joey Votto, and Sean Doolittle.

On September 19, 2016, the Schur-created sitcom The Good Place began airing on NBC. The supernatural series concerning philosophy and being a good person, starring Kristen Bell and Ted Danson, became a surprise critical and commercial success, concluding its four-season run on January 30, 2020.

In 2016, Schur and Rashida Jones co-wrote the teleplay of "Nosedive", an episode of the television anthology series Black Mirror,  from a story by Charlie Brooker.

In 2019, Schur joined other WGA writers in firing their agents as part of the Writers Guild of America's stand against the ATA and the practice of packaging.

In 2019, Schur began development of a scripted comedy called Rutherford Falls starring Ed Helms. The series premiered on the streaming service Peacock on April 22, 2021. He worked on several projects on IMDb TV. He also reupped his overall deal at Universal Television.

Personal life
Schur is married to J. J. Philbin, who was formerly a writer on The O.C. and is the daughter of Regis Philbin. Their son was born in February 2008 and daughter in July 2010.

He is a vegetarian.

Filmography

Awards and nominations

Bibliography

References

External links

Interview with Michael Schur
Where are they now? Interview About His Public Schooling

1975 births
21st-century American Jews
21st-century American male writers
21st-century American screenwriters
American bloggers
American male bloggers
American male television actors
American television directors
American male television writers
American television writers
Hall High School (Connecticut) alumni
Harvard University alumni
Hugo Award-winning writers
Jewish American male actors
Jewish American screenwriters
Living people
NBCUniversal people
Nebula Award winners
People from West Hartford, Connecticut
Primetime Emmy Award winners
Showrunners
Screenwriters from Connecticut
Screenwriters from Michigan
Television producers from Connecticut
Television producers from Michigan
The Harvard Lampoon alumni
Writers from Ann Arbor, Michigan
Writers Guild of America Award winners